St Stephen's Hospital Delhi is one of the oldest and the largest private hospitals in New Delhi, India. The hospital today has 600 beds and is presently a superspeciality tertiary care hospital offering comprehensive care covering all major clinical specialities and most super-specialities. The institution started as a dispensary in 1876 by the Delhi Female Medical Mission, on the banks of river Yamuna. The hospital was later established in 1885 as a small facility with 50 beds in Chandni Chowk and opened by Lady Dufferin, Vicereine of India. It was the first hospital for women and children.

Education 
St. Stephen's Hospital was the first one to begin training the Indian women as nurses in 1867. The training School for nurses was started under Alice Wilkinson—the first trained British nurse who joined the hospital in 1908. Wilkinson became the hospital's nursing superintendent. She also founded the Trained Nurse's Association of India and worked as its secretary until 1948. The first school of nursing in India was started much later in 1871 at Government General Hospital, Chennai.

The hospital is also one of the major teaching hospitals offering speciality and superspeciality courses affiliated to the National Board of Examinations and recognized by the Medical Council of India. The hospital also won the national award from the National Board of Examinations for the excellence in teaching in the Diplomate of National Board programme

The hospital also trains laboratory technicians to perform standardized Hemophilia tests under the aegis of Hemophilia Federation of India

Research 

The hospital has a rich tradition contributing to research and knowledge advancing healthcare. Records of publications from the institute date back to 1894 on surgical procedures to much recent on red cell abnormalities. The hospital also contributed to the World Health Organization Trauma Care Checklist Program Care Process Measures. An active research group works in the area of gestational diabetes and Rheumatology.

The organisation is recognized by Department of Scientific and Industrial Research, Government of India.

History 
The hospital was started as 50 bedded facility in Chandni Chowk, overlooking Queen's Gardens now known as Company Bagh way back in 1885 as a hospital for women and children.  It was the dream of the Delhi Female Medical Mission to operate in a hospital. The St. Stephen's Hospital for Women and Children was founded in memory of Priscilla Winter, founder of Delhi Female Medical Mission In the late 1890s, the Mission's treated around 600-700 patients in the new hospital, 15,000 at the dispensaries, and 1,200 through home visits

The hospital was centrally located in old Delhi and was the first hospital solely dedicated to the care of women and children in Delhi. The hospital was known for its thorough hygiene and discipline. Although the hospital initially first lacked both resources and staff, it began to take off in 1891.

The hospital hired their first female doctor, Jenny Muller, a woman of Indian-German origins who had attended the London School of Medicine for Women. In 1893, a second female doctor, Mildred Staley joined.

The hospital building was opened by Lady Dufferin, Vicereine of India. The foundation stone for the old hospital building at Tis Hazari was laid in 1906 and the hospital was opened in 1909.

The maternity block at Tis Hazari campus was opened in 1969 by Indira Gandhi the Prime Minister of India. The foundation stone for the General Hospital was laid in 1972 by V. V. Giri the President of India and opened by Indira Gandhi in 1976. The mother and child block was later named after Dr Lucy Oommen, the first Indian medical director of the institute and a Padma Shri awardee by Dr.A. P. J. Abdul Kalam, the President of India

A commemorative stamp was issued by the postal department in 1985 with the picture of the central hospital building and the first day cover depicting the first hospital building at Chandni Chowk.

Specialties 
The hospital provides patients with the following services:
 Anesthesia
 Cardio-Thoracic and Vascular Surgery
 Cardiology
 Casualty
 Community Health
 Dental & Faciomaxillary Surgery
 Dermatology
 E.N.T
 Endocrinology
 Gastroenterology
 Histo Pathology
 Laboratory Services
 Medicine
 Nephrology
 Neurology
 Neurosurgery
 Obstetrics and Gynaecology
 Ophthalmology
 Orthopaedics
 Paediatrics
 Paediatrics surgery
 Plastic surgery
 Psychiatry
 Radiology
 Reproductive and retal medicine (RFM)
 Respiratory pulmonary medicine
 Rheumatology
 Surgery
 Urology

Notable personalities 
The hospital has contributed a number of notable personalities in modern-day India, including:
Dr. Marie Elizabeth Hayes, Medical Professional
Dr. Lucy Oommen, Padma Shri awardee.
Dr Balu Sankaran professor, scientist and recipient of the Padma Shri and Padma Vibushan awards.
Dr. Mathew Varghese, who runs India's only polio ward

Community Health Centre 
The Community Health Centre, established in 1981 and inaugurated by Jagmohan, the then Lt Governor of Delhi and situated in Nand Nagri serve people with preventive, pro motive, curative & rehabilitative care

Last polio ward in India 
The hospital also runs the distinction of running the last polio ward in the country. While, India eradicated polio in 2011, millions live with the scars left over by the disease. The ward run by Dr Mathew Varghese, a renowned orthopedic surgeon who provides care, treatment and rehabilitation to individuals debilitated by polio

References 

Hospitals in Delhi
Teaching hospitals in India
Hospitals established in 1885
1885 establishments in India